Barnabás Vári (born 15 September 1987) is a Hungarian football player who plays for Szeged-Csanád.

Club statistics

Updated to games played as of 19 May 2019.

References 

HLSZ
MLSZ

1987 births
Sportspeople from Szeged
Living people
Hungarian footballers
Association football defenders
Dunaújváros FC players
Paksi FC players
Szolnoki MÁV FC footballers
Kisvárda FC players
Győri ETO FC players
Szeged-Csanád Grosics Akadémia footballers
Nemzeti Bajnokság I players
Nemzeti Bajnokság II players